This is a list of civil parishes in the ceremonial county of Norfolk, England. There are 540 civil parishes.

Population figures are unavailable for some of the smallest parishes.

King's Lynn, Great Yarmouth and Norwich are unparished.

See also
 Catch-land
 List of civil parishes in England

References

External links
 Office for National Statistics : Geographical Area Listings

Norfolk
Civil parishes